Samuil Khaimovich Agurskii (1884–1947) was a Belorussian Communist and historian.

Life and career 

Samuil Khaimovich Agurskii was born in Grodno in 1884. He joined the Bund following the 1905 Russian Revolution and subsequently lived in England and the United States between 1906 and 1917. In America, he was active in anarchism and the Yiddish press. He was Jewish commissar of Vitebsk between 1918 and 1919. He moved to Moscow but visited the United States twice in the next four years, helping to found the American Communist Party. In the mid- and late-1920s, he compiled historical documents on the history of the Jewish labor movement in the Belorussian Communist Party. He worked to discredit the Bund. In the late 1930s, the Belorussian Communist Party accused Agurskii of idealizing the Bund and subverting the Belorussian Academy of Sciences. Sentenced to exile in Kazakhstan, he died there in 1947. He was posthumously rehabilitated in 1956.

References

Further reading 

 
 
 

1884 births
1947 deaths
People from Grodno
20th-century Belarusian historians
Belarusian male writers
Jewish historians
Communist Party of Byelorussia politicians
Exiled politicians
Male non-fiction writers